John McKibbon (born 14 September 1939) is a Canadian basketball player. He competed in the men's tournament at the 1964 Summer Olympics.

References

External links
 

1939 births
Living people
Canadian men's basketball players
Olympic basketball players of Canada
Basketball players at the 1964 Summer Olympics
Basketball people from Ontario
Sportspeople from Greater Sudbury